NHNN may refer to:
 National Hospital for Neurology and Neurosurgery in London, UK
 State Bank of Vietnam (Ngân hàng Nhà nước)